The 2012 Anchorage mayoral election was held on April 20, 2012, to elect the mayor of Anchorage, Alaska. It saw reelection of incumbent mayor Dan Sullivan.

Since Sullivan obtained a 45% plurality in the initial round, no runoff was necessitated.

Results

References

See also

2012 United States mayoral elections
2012 Alaska elections 
2012